Meena Shorey (13 November 1921 – 3 September 1989) was a Pakistani film actress who worked first in Indian cinema and later Pakistani cinema. She appeared in Hindi/Urdu and Punjabi films. Credited in films by her mononym, Meena, her real name was Khurshid Jehan. She started her acting career playing a character role, as  Ambhi, Raja of Taxila's sister in Sohrab Modi's Sikandar (1941). Married to her third husband, Roop K. Shorey, by the mid-1940s, she found fame when she acted in her husband's film Ek Thi Larki (1949), opposite actor Motilal. The story was written by I. S. Johar, who also starred in the film. The "foot-tapping" music  composed by Vinod became a "huge hit", with Meena becoming an "icon" for the "new liberated" young women. Meena was acclaimed as the "Lara Lappa Girl", from the song of same title in the film. She was one of the first women to be recognised in Indian cinema as a "comedienne of calibre". She was also popularly known as The Droll Queen of Partition as she worked in both in India and Pakistan.

In 1956, she went to Lahore, Pakistan with her husband, where they were invited by Pakistani producer J.C. Anand to make a film there following her mass popularity with the public in both India and Pakistan. The film Shorey made was Miss 56, a copy of the Guru Dutt-Madhubala starrer Mr. & Mrs. '55. Instead of returning to India when her husband did, she decided to stay back in Pakistan, continuing her acting career there. Some of her best films in India included the Punjabi film Chaman (1948), Actress (1948), Ek Thi Ladki (1949), Dholak (1951), and Ek Do Teen (1953).

Early life
Meena was born Khurshid Jehan, on 17 November 1921, in Raiwind, Punjab, British India, the second of four children. Her family was poor and her father struggled to support the family. His first business venture, in Ferozepur, failed when Khurshid was very young. Moving to Lahore, he then worked at a dyeing business, which also failed. However, by this time, he had managed to arrange a good marriage for his eldest daughter, Wazir Begum, and she left for Bombay after her marriage. A few years later, Wazir Begum called Khurshid to stay with her for some time in Bombay, her idea being to arrange a suitable marriage for Khurshid also, from among her husband's relatives.

However, fate took an unexpected turn when Sohrab Modi noticed Meena at the launch of his film Sikandar (1941), which she attended with her brother-in-law, and offered her a supporting role in the film, giving her the name, Meena.

Career

In India

Sikandar in 1941 was the first film Meena acted in, which had her in the small role of King of Taxila's sister. This was a historical film about the invasion of India in the Jhelum region by Alexander (Sikandar). It was directed by Sohrab Modi and starred Prithviraj Kapoor as Sikandar. The film became "an all-India hit" and provided an instant launching pad for her. She then went on to act as the second lead in three more films under Modi's Minerva Movietone banner, Phir Milenge (1942), Prithvi Vallabh (1943) and Pattharon Ka Saudagar.

Roop K. Shorey, who was based in Lahore, migrated to Bombay and wanted to sign Meena for his film, Shalimar (1946). However Meena had signed a contract with Sohrab Modi, which prevented her from working not only in Shalimar, but also in Mehboob Khan's Humayun (1945). On a visit to Lahore, she was signed by producer Dalsukh Pancholi, for two films Shehar Se Door (1946) and Arsi (1947). She finally freed herself from the contract by taking Modi's wife Mehtab's help, getting the amount of money asked for by Modi, lowered.

In 1948, Chaman (Garden) in Punjabi, was directed by Roop K. Shorey, who having suffered a loss of the family business in Lahore had moved to Bombay following the partition. There he set up his banner Shorey Films and produced the film Chaman with the help of his wife's finances. It had Meena act in the "first post—Partition, Punjabi film in India". It co-starred Karan Dewan, Kuldip Kaur and Majnu, and became a "major hit". The "melodious music", which was composed by Vinod became "instantly popular". One of the famous songs from the film was "Chan Kithan Guzari Aai Raat Way" sung by Pushpa Hans and chorus. It was the debut of Pushpa Hans as a singer.

In 1949, came Ek Thi Larki, produced and directed by Roop K. Shorey, with story written by I. S. Johar. The music was composed by Vinod whose song "Lara Lappa Lara Lappa Laayi Rakhdi" became the "highlight of the film". A "trendsetter", the song continued to remain popular over the years. The playback singing was provided by Lata Mangeshkar, and though it's counted as one of Lata's earliest hits, the person mainly remembered for the song is the actress lip-syncing it in the film, Meena, who became "known thereafter as the Lara-Lappa Girl".  The film was stated to be "the biggest runaway- hit" making Roop K. Shorey one of the top comedy film directors.

She acted in Ek Teri Nishani in 1949 opposite Trilok Kapoor and the film also starred I. S. Johar, Cuckoo and Om Prakash.
In 1950, she acted in the Karan Dewan Production's Anmol Ratan, with Karan Dewan and Nirmala. Dholak (1951) was produced by Shorey Films and directed by Roop Shorey. It starred Meena with Ajit, with music composed by Shyam Sunder. Shyam Sunder was stated to have given some "unforgettable melodies" in this film among others. In 1953, in Ek Do Teen, Shorey tried to recreate the magic of Ek Thi Ladki, by continuing with the same "Lara Lappa" theme. Meena was once again paired with Motilal, and music was provided by Vinod. However, the film was unable to have the same effect as Ek Thi Ladki. Her last two films released in India were G. P. Sippy's Shrimati 420 for Sippy Films and Chandu (1958) directed by Majnu and starring Om Prakash, Shashikala, Mehmood and Pran.

In Pakistan
Roop K. Shorey and Meena were invited to Pakistan by Pakistani film producer J.C. Anand to make a film. Miss 1956 (1956) was a plagiarised version of Guru Dutt's Mr. & Mrs. '55 (1955) and starred Meena Shorey, Santosh Kumar, Shamim Ara, and Noor Mohammed Charlie. The music was composed by G. A. Chisti. Meena was well received in Lahore and she decided to stay back when her husband returned to India. She went on to become the "first Pakistani actress to model for Lux" and became known as the "Lux Lady of Pakistan".

Her most famous film was Sarfarosh (1956), in which she had a special character role, with two very popular songs based around her. Originally slated to play the main lead, she was then assigned this side role and carried it off with aplomb. Directed by Anwar Kamal Pasha, the film starred Sabiha Khanum and Santosh Kumar and had music by Rasheed Attre. The film was a superhit box-office success.

Some of the films she acted in a main role were Bara Aadmi (1957), directed by Humayun Mirza in Urdu and co-starring Meena Shorey and Ejaz Durrani, Sitaron ki Duniya (1958), directed by M. H. Mohib, Jagga (1958) in Punjabi and directed by Saqlain Rizvi, Behrupiya (1960) (Punjabi) directed by Aslam Irani. Her other notable films were Mausiqar (1962) directed by Qadeer Ghori, Andhi Mohabbat (1964) and Khamosh Raho (1964) directed by Jameel Akhtar.

Personal life
Meena is reported to have married five times.
Her first marriage was to actor-producer-director Zahur Raja. In Filmindia April 1942, it was mentioned in an interview with Zahur Raja that Zahur and Meena were married for the last "six months". The two met while shooting for Sikandar and fell in love. "Zahur has been married for six months to Meena, a pretty young actress who is at present making probably her last film Phir Milenge".
Her second marriage was to actor and co-star, Al Nasir. She separated from him by the mid-40s, and Al Nasir went on to marry the actress Veena. Baburao Patel mentioned him as one of Meena's ex-husbands in a column in Filmindia August 1946, "Al Nasir, the once reported ex-husband of film actress Meena, is now reported to have married film actress Manorama of Punjab".
Her third marriage was to Roop K. Shorey which lasted till 1956. Due to the relative length of the marriage, about 7–8 years, and the fact that she briefly attained success as an actress only in this period, she came to be known by her third husband's name. They separated after a successful trip to Pakistan, when Meena decided to remain in that country, while Roop Shorey, a Hindu gentleman, stuck to the original plan of returning to India. 
Her fourth marriage was to Raza Mir, a Pakistani film cinematographer and film producer
Her fifth marriage was to Asad Bokhari, her co-star in Jamalo (1962).

Meena had three children including two sons from one of her marriages later she adopted a girl.

Death 
In Pakistan, Meena lived a life of poverty towards the end of her life, and had to struggle to survive after 1974–75. Then Meena went to live with her nephew and Malika Pukhraj helped her financially. Upon her death, her funeral arrangements were made by charity money. She died on 3 September 1989, in Lahore, Punjab, Pakistan.

Filmography

Television

Film

In India
List:

In Pakistan
List:

Awards and recognition

References

External links

1921 births
Actresses in Punjabi cinema
People from British India
1989 deaths
Actresses from Lahore
Indian film actresses
Actresses in Urdu cinema
Actresses in Hindi cinema
20th-century Indian actresses
Pakistani film actresses
20th-century Pakistani actresses
Indian emigrants to Pakistan
Nigar Award winners
Punjabi people
People from Lahore